Giuseppe Fortis (20 July 1935 – 27 May 2000) was an Italian film and television actor. He was also a voice actor, dubbing foreign films for release in Italian.

Selected filmography
 The Changing of the Guard (1962)
 The Sign of the Coyote (1963)
 Goliath and the Rebel Slave (1963)
 The Thief of Damascus (1964)
 Agent 077: From the Orient with Fury (1965)
 How We Robbed the Bank of Italy (1966)
 Ringo the Lone Rider (1968)
 Beatrice Cenci (1969)
 Erika (1971)
 The Working Class Goes to Heaven (1971)
 Black Belly of the Tarantula (1971)
 The Eroticist (1972)
 La bestia nello spazio (1980)

References

Bibliography 
 Roy Kinnard & Tony Crnkovich. Italian Sword and Sandal Films, 1908–1990. McFarland, 2017.

External links 
 

1935 births
2000 deaths
Italian male television actors
Italian male film actors
Italian male voice actors
Male actors from Rome